Miracle is an unincorporated community located in Lincoln County, Kentucky, United States.

References

Unincorporated communities in Lincoln County, Kentucky
Unincorporated communities in Kentucky